Carlo Luigi Coraggio (born 23 September 1989), better known as Carl Brave, is an Italian singer, rapper and record producer.

He rose to fame in 2017, as part of the duo Carl Brave x Franco126, with the album Polaroid. As a solo artist he released two album, Notti Brave (2018), which topped the Italian Albums Chart, and Coraggio (2020). As of 2020, the singer has sold over 2 million copies in Italy, thanks to successful singles and collaborations "Fotografia" with Francesca Michielin and Fabri Fibra, Elisa's single "Vivere tutte le vite" , "Posso" with Max Gazzè and "Spigoli" with Tha Supreme.

Career 
In 2017 Carl Brave and Franco126 published their collaborative album Polaroid and embarked on a tour across Italy. At the end of the tour, the duo announced a hiatus to pursue solo projects. His debut solo album, Notti Brave, was released on 11 May 2018. Its lead single, "Fotografia", features vocals by singer-songwriter Francesca Michielin and rapper Fabri Fibra.
In November 2018, Carl Brave released a new single, "Posso", featuring Max Gazzè and preceding a repack of the album, titled Notti Brave After.

In 2019, he appeared as a featured artist on the single "Vivere tutte le vite" by Elisa. The singles "Che poi" and "Regina Coeli", both preceding his second studio album, were released in January 2020 and in March 2020, respectively. The second studio album Coraggio was published on 9 October 2020, with the third single "Parli Parli" with italian singer Elodie.

Discography

Albums

Collaborative albums

Singles

As lead artist

As featured artist

Album appearances

References

1989 births
Living people
Singers from Rome
Italian rappers
Italian pop singers
21st-century Italian male singers